Robert Coombes or Coombs may refer to:
 Robert Coombes (rower), British sculler
 Robert Coombes (murderer), British minor convicted of murdering his mother
 Rob Coombes, English musician
 Robert Coombs (politician), member of the New South Wales Legislative Assembly
 Robert Coombs (cricketer), English cricketer
 Robin Coombs (Robert Royston Amos Coombs), British immunologist

See also
 Robert Coombe, chemist and educator